The 1954 NCAA Cross Country Championships were the 16th annual cross country meet to determine the team and individual national champions of men's collegiate cross country running in the United States. Held on November 22, 1954, the meet was hosted by Michigan State College at the Forest Akers East Golf Course in East Lansing, Michigan. The distance for the race was 4 miles (6.4 kilometers). 

Since the current multi-division format for NCAA championship did not begin until 1973, all NCAA members were eligible. In total, 14 teams and 113 individual runners contested this championship.

The team national championship was won by the Oklahoma A&M Cowboys, their first. The individual championship was won by Allen Frame, from Kansas, with a time of 19:54.20.

Men's title
Distance: 4 miles (6.4 kilometers)

Team Result (Top 10)

References
 

NCAA Cross Country Championships
NCAA Men's Cross Country Championships
Sports competitions in East Lansing, Michigan
NCAA Cross Country
November 1954 sports events in the United States
Track and field in Michigan
Michigan State University